Second Army or 2nd Army may refer to:

Germany 
 2nd Army (German Empire), a World War I field army
 2nd Army (Wehrmacht), a World War II field army
 2nd Panzer Army

Russia / Soviet Union 
 2nd Army (Russian Empire), fought at Tannenberg in 1914
 2nd Army (RSFSR), fought in the Russian Civil War
 2nd Ukrainian Soviet Army, fought in the Russian Civil War
 2nd Red Banner Army, a Soviet field army of World War II

Others 
 II Army (Argentina)
 Second Army (Australia)
 2nd Army (Austria-Hungary)
 Second Army (Bulgaria)
 Second Army (Egypt)
 Second Army (France)
 Second Army (Hungary)
 Second Army (Italy)
 Second Army (Japan)
 Second Army (Ottoman Empire)
 Second Army (Poland)
 Second Army (Romania)
 Second Army (Serbia)
 Second Army (Turkey)
 Second Army (United Kingdom)
 Second Army (Home Forces), also in the United Kingdom
 2nd Army (Kingdom of Yugoslavia)
 Second United States Army

See also 
 II Corps (disambiguation)
 Second Army Corps (Spanish-American War)
 2nd Guards Army
 2nd Guards Tank Army
 2nd Division (disambiguation)
 2nd Brigade (disambiguation)
 2nd Regiment (disambiguation)